The City of London (Garbling of Spices and Admission of Brokers) Act 1707 was an act of the Parliament of Great Britain. The act reformed the office of 'garbler' and regulated brokers in the City of London.

Provisions
The provisions of the act include:
Repealing the Spices Act 1603 and discharging any suits and penalties stemming from it.
Allowing the Lord Mayor and Aldermen of the City of London to appoint and employ an official 'garbler' who would 'garble' (remove impurities from) spices, drugs or other goods at a set salary, with the profits from the job being reserved for the City of London.
Allowing the Chamberlain of London to charge 40 shillings to brokers for entry into the city and another 40 shillings on the 29 September annually after the end of the first session of Parliament. The money raised would in the first instance be given to William Stewart, who had held the office of garbler since 1686, to compensate for loss of earnings under the new system. After paying Stewart, the remaining revenues could then be 'enjoyed' by the Mayor and citizens of the City of London.
Making it a finable offence to act as a broker within the City of London without being admitted as such, punishable with a fine of £25.

Repeal
The act was repealed by the Food and Drugs Act 1938.

References

Great Britain Acts of Parliament 1707
History of the City of London
Repealed Great Britain Acts of Parliament